Fernando Ruiz de Castro (died 1377) was a Galician nobleman. 

Fernando Ruiz de Castro or the variation Fernando Rodríguez de Castro may also refer to:
Fernando Rodríguez de Castro (1125–1185), Castilian nobleman
Fernando Rodríguez de Castro (died 1304), Galician nobleman
 (1505–1575), mayordomo mayor
Fernando Ruiz de Castro Andrade y Portugal (1548–1601), viceroy of Naples

See also
 de Castro
 Castro (disambiguation)
 Fernando Castro (disambiguation)